Jovan "Jovo" Aranitović (born 19 August 1974) is a Montenegrin retired footballer who last played for FK Trepča.

Club career
Born in Pljevlja, SR Montenegro, he spent most of his career in Serbia playing for Red Star Belgrade, FK Sloga Kraljevo, FK Beograd, FK Obilić, FK Železnik, FK Radnički Kragujevac, FK Rudar Pljevlja and FK Javor Ivanjica, playing in the First League of FR Yugoslavia, but he also played abroad, in Bosnia with FK Borac Banja Luka, in Hungary, with Győri ETO FC, and in Macedonia, with FK Makedonija Gjorče Petrov. Before retiring, he played in Serbian Second Leagie clubs FK BASK and FK Novi Pazar.

By September 2014 he was still active playing with FK Trepča.

References

External sources
 Profile and stats at Srbijafudbal
 Profile at Playerhistory. 

1974 births
Living people
Sportspeople from Pljevlja
Association football defenders
Serbia and Montenegro footballers
Montenegrin footballers
Red Star Belgrade footballers
FK Sloga Kraljevo players
FK Beograd players
FK Obilić players
FK Borac Banja Luka players
FK Železnik players
FK Radnički 1923 players
FK Rudar Pljevlja players
FK Javor Ivanjica players
Győri ETO FC players
FK Makedonija Gjorče Petrov players
FK BASK players
FK Novi Pazar players
FK Trepča players
First League of Serbia and Montenegro players
Premier League of Bosnia and Herzegovina players
Nemzeti Bajnokság I players
First League of the Federation of Bosnia and Herzegovina players
Macedonian First Football League players
Serbia and Montenegro expatriate footballers
Expatriate footballers in Bosnia and Herzegovina
Serbia and Montenegro expatriate sportspeople in Bosnia and Herzegovina
Expatriate footballers in Hungary
Serbia and Montenegro expatriate sportspeople in Hungary
Expatriate footballers in North Macedonia
Serbia and Montenegro expatriate sportspeople in North Macedonia
Montenegrin expatriate footballers
Montenegrin expatriate sportspeople in Serbia